William Wyamar Vaughan (25 February 1865 - 4 February 1938) was a British educationalist.

Vaughan was the son of Sir Henry Halford Vaughan, Regius Professor of Modern History at Oxford.  His mother Adeline Maria Jackson was Julia Stephen's older sister making him a maternal first cousin to Virginia Woolf. In 1898 he married Margaret Symonds, daughter of John Addington Symonds; they had two sons and a daughter. Their daughter was noted physiologist, Dame Janet Vaughan. Margaret Vaughan died in 1925. In 1929 William Vaughan married Elizabeth Geldard.

Vaughan was educated at Rugby, New College, Oxford and the University of Paris.  Vaughan was a master of Clifton College 1890-1904 before being appointed Headmaster of Giggleswick School (1904–1910), Wellington College (1910–1921) and Rugby School (1921–1931). He retired in 1931.

He fell and broke his leg while visiting the Taj Mahal in December 1937 during the Indian Science Congress, resulting in his leg being amputated. He died two months later.

External links
 
 http://www.cliftonrfchistory.co.uk/match/bathsept1893/bathsept1893.htm

1865 births
1938 deaths
People educated at Rugby School
Alumni of New College, Oxford
University of Paris alumni
British educational theorists
Head Masters of Rugby School
Masters of Wellington College, Berkshire